The Optics Valley International Tennis Centre, is a tennis facility located in Wuhan, Hubei Province, China. The center is the venue for the Wuhan Open, a professional tournament on the Women's Tennis Association tour and held annually since 2014.

The center is located in the Wuhan East Lake New Technology Development Zone, being adjacent to Erfei Hill.

Gallery

See also
Official Wikimapia site
 List of tennis stadiums by capacity

References

Sports venues in Wuhan
Tennis venues in China